The 2014 Four Nations Tournament (Torneio Quatro Nações) in Portuguese, was the first edition of the Four Nations Tournament held in São Bernardo do Campo, Brazil between 30 October –1 November as a Men's friendly handball tournament organised by the Brazilian Handball Confederation.

Results

Round robin

Final standing

References

External links
Tournament page on CBHb official web site

Four Nations Tournament (handball)
2014 in handball
2014 in Brazilian sport
Four